Frederick Edgar Ferguson (born August 18, 1939) is a former United States Army warrant officer and later officer, as well as a recipient of the United States military's highest decoration—the Medal of Honor—for his actions in the Vietnam War while a chief warrant officer 3.

Biography
Ferguson joined the United States Army from Phoenix, Arizona in 1958, and by January 31, 1968 was a chief warrant officer 3 in command of a UH-1 Huey as part of Company C, 227th Aviation Battalion, 1st Cavalry Division (Airmobile). On that day, Ferguson voluntarily piloted his aircraft through intense enemy fire to rescue the crew and passengers of a downed helicopter in Huế, South Vietnam.

In addition to the Medal of Honor—the first awarded to a United States Army aviator in Vietnam, and the first in modern army aviation history—Ferguson was awarded two Silver Stars, the Distinguished Flying Cross, the Bronze Star Medal, and 39 Air Medals.

Ferguson's additional honors include Military Aviator of the Year ("Kitty Hawk" Award of the Wright Brother's Committee), the President's Award, the U.S. Army Aviation Hall of Fame, and the Arizona Aviation Hall of Fame. He was also honored by the US Postal Service along with 23 other Vietnam Medal of Honor recipients with a limited edition stamp.

Ferguson served in the Arizona Army National Guard, rising to the rank of major before reverting to warrant officer rank in order to continue instructing in the UH-1.

Ferguson was deputy director of the Arizona Department of Veterans' Services in 2000.

Medal of Honor citation
Chief Warrant Officer Ferguson's official Medal of Honor citation reads:

See also

List of Medal of Honor recipients for the Vietnam War

References

1939 births
Living people
United States Army personnel of the Vietnam War
United States Army Medal of Honor recipients
Recipients of the Silver Star
Recipients of the Distinguished Flying Cross (United States)
Recipients of the Gallantry Cross (Vietnam)
United States Army officers
Vietnam War recipients of the Medal of Honor
People from Pilot Point, Texas
American Master Army Aviators
Military personnel from Texas